Ivan Stoyanov may refer to:

Ivan Stoyanov (footballer, born 1949) (1949–2017), Bulgarian footballer
Ivan Stoyanov (footballer, born 1983), Bulgarian footballer
Ivan Stoyanov (footballer, born 1991), Bulgarian footballer
Ivan Stoyanov (footballer, born 1994), Bulgarian footballer
Ivan Stoyanov (long jumper) (born 1969), Bulgarian long jumper
Ivan Stoyanov, competed for Bulgaria in the Junior Eurovision Song Contest 2015